Javad Marandi  (born February 1968) is a British businessman and property developer, with investments in commercial and residential real estate.

Early life

He was born in February 1968, in Tehran, Iran. He moved to Britain in 1979, and studied Electrical and Electronics Engineering. He then qualified as a UK chartered accountant, at Coopers & Lybrand (now part of PricewaterhouseCoopers). In the 1990s, he worked as a business development manager for the Coca-Cola Company in Central Asia, and the area manager for emerging markets at Phillip Morris international, before starting his own businesses in tobacco distribution, advertising and telecommunications, eventually holding the franchise agreement for McDonalds in Azerbaijan.

Investments

Property  
Marandi has invested in numerous luxury establishments within the hospitality sector, including hotels such as Soho Farmhouse, Soho House group's country hotel and club in Oxfordshire, England, Chais Monnet, a 92-room luxury hotel, restaurant and retail development in Cognac, France, Sofitel Brussels, and CenterParc in Moselle, France. He has also invested in restaurants such as Shirvan, Michelin starred-chef Akrame Benallal's high-end restaurant on Place d'Alma, in central Paris.

Marandi is both an investor and developer in the UK property market.

Retail  
In 2014, Marandi took a majority stake in Wed2B, a UK mid-market wedding apparel retailer, focused on regional UK towns and cities. Since his involvement in the business, the company has expanded from three to over 40 stores. Wed2B ranked in the FT1000 in both 2019 and 2020, and placed in the Sunday Times Virgin Fast Track 100 in both 2017 and 2018” It ranks Britain's fastest-growing privately held companies by sales growth over the preceding 3 years.

In March 2020, the Marandi family acquired 100% of the Conran Shop, the luxury interior design and furniture retailer founded by Sir Terence Conran in 1973

Logistics 
Marandi held a controlling stake in Roth Gerueste, a Swiss market scaffolding and hi-tech building materials manufacturer up until early 2021.

Philanthropy 

The Marandi Foundation supports children's health and education; and cultural history and art. Marandi is also chairman of the advisory board of The Watercolour World, a charity working to provide online public access to thousands of documentary watercolours from all over the world. The goal of the charity is to collate a unique visual history of the world. The Prince of Wales and the Duchess of Cornwall are joint patrons of the Watercolour World, which is chaired by Fred Hohler. In March 2021, Marandi was appointed co-chair to the Growth Board of homelessness charity Centrepoint. In 2021, The Marandi Foundation partnered with the Conran Shop on the New Designer of the Future Award, which supports creative talent denoting an accolade and a £40,000 in investment money to further develop the winner's ideas.

Personal life
Marandi owns a home in Eaton Square in London's Belgravia worth about £12.5 million, and is one of Azerbaijan's richest men. He has "two private jets and a passion for vintage wine".

He is a donor to the Conservative Party (UK). During the 2019 United Kingdom general election campaign, he donated £250,000 to the party.

His wife Narmina is the daughter of Ali Alizadeh, an oncologist in Baku, Azerbaijan. Javad and Narmina are investors in Anya Hindmarch and Emilia Wickstead, the London-based fashion houses.  Narmina is a co-chair of the British Fashion Council Foundation as well as a patron and board member of the BFC Fashion Trust and co-head of the Cultural and Social Committee of the Serpentine Galleries.

Marandi was appointed Officer of the Order of the British Empire (OBE) in the 2020 New Year Honours for services to business and philanthropy.

External links
 WED2B website

References

1968 births
British businesspeople
Living people
People from Tehran
Iranian emigrants to the United Kingdom
Naturalised citizens of the United Kingdom
Officers of the Order of the British Empire
Conservative Party (UK) donors